Dimitrios Mazis (born 5 September 1976) is a Greek former water polo player who competed in the 2000 Summer Olympics, in the 2004 Summer Olympics, and in the 2008 Summer Olympics.

He currently serves as the head coach of Panathinaikos Water Polo Club.

See also
 List of World Aquatics Championships medalists in water polo

References

External links
 

1976 births
Living people
Greek male water polo players
Olympiacos Water Polo Club players
Olympic water polo players of Greece
Panathinaikos swimmers
Panathinaikos Water Polo Club coaches
Water polo players at the 2000 Summer Olympics
Water polo players at the 2004 Summer Olympics
Water polo players at the 2008 Summer Olympics
Ethnikos WPC
World Aquatics Championships medalists in water polo

Ethnikos Piraeus Water Polo Club players